Zakaria Kola (also Romanized as Z̄akarīā Kolā and Z̄akarīyā Kolā; also known as Z̄akarīyā Kūlā, Zekarreyā Kolā, and Zekarrīā Kalā) is a village in Chahardangeh Rural District, Chahardangeh District, Sari County, Mazandaran Province, Iran. At the 2006 census, its population was 101, in 27 families.

References 

Populated places in Sari County